Daniel Masson (born April 1897, date of death unknown) was a French racing cyclist. He finished in last place in the 1922 and 1923 Tour de France.

References

External links

1897 births
Year of death missing
French male cyclists
Place of birth missing